Joshua Gros (born June 25, 1982 in Mechanicsburg, Pennsylvania) is a retired American soccer player.

Gros is the team coordinator for the Philadelphia Union, a Major League Soccer team. He was hired on June 11, 2009, under head coach Piotr Nowak. Nowak coached Gros on the 2004 MLS Cup-champion D.C. United. Nowak had previously hired him as an assistant when he led the USA Olympic team to Beijing in 2008.

Career

College
Gros played college soccer at Rutgers University from 2000 to 2003.  As a freshman, Gros started 15 matches and led the team with seven assists.  Although he moved into a consistent starting role as a sophomore, he only registered three points, all on assists.  Upon moving to the offensive midfield as a junior, Gros's production increased sharply and he finished the year with six goals and one assist.  Gros far bettered this as a senior, finishing the year with 16 goals and five assists, and was named the Big East offensive player of the year.  He was also chosen to National Player of the Week on September 22, 2003, by College Soccer News.  During his professional career, however, Gros gradually took on a more defensive role.

Professional
Gros was selected 34th overall in the 2004 MLS SuperDraft by D.C. United, and immediately impressed during preseason, earning himself a spot on the regular season lineup. Gros intended to join the Marine Corps had he not made the team.  However, he did make the team, and soon his work rate earned him a surprise spot in the D.C. starting lineup.  Gros seized this opportunity. His excellent, determined play made him a starter for much of the year, playing midfield on either wing or left back.  He finished the year with 21 starts and 2087 minutes, in which he scored a goal and notched four assists.  Gros continued to start for United throughout the 2005 and 2006 seasons. In 2006, he was named an MLS All-Star and played the entire All-Star Game against Chelsea.

In the 2007 MLS season, Gros started and played in 21 games for United, despite having suffered numerous head traumas.  Following the season, he announced his retirement as a result of his accumulated head injuries.

International
Gros earned his only cap with the U.S. national team in a 2–0 victory over Mexico on February 7, 2007.

Personal life
His nickname amongst D.C. United players was “The Sarge”. 

After retirement from playing due to head trauma initially trained and worked as a civil engineer. He worked on designing projects for the U.S. Navy and Air Force.

Career statistics

Honors

D.C. United
 Major League Soccer Supporter's Shield: 2006, 2007

References

1982 births
Living people
American soccer players
United States men's international soccer players
D.C. United players
Major League Soccer players
Rutgers Scarlet Knights men's soccer players
Major League Soccer All-Stars
Soccer players from Pennsylvania
D.C. United draft picks
People from Mechanicsburg, Pennsylvania
Philadelphia Union non-playing staff
Association football midfielders